1843 Naval Air Squadron (1843 NAS) was a Naval Air Squadron of the Royal Navy's Fleet Air Arm.

History
No.1843 Squadron Fleet Air Arm formed at NAS Brunswick on 1 May 1944 as a single seater fighter squadron. Equipped with 18 Corsair IIIs, these were replaced by Mk. In August it became part of the 3rd Carrier Air Group.
 
On 1 October 1952, No.1830A Squadron formed at Donibristle as an Anti-Submarine squadron of the Scottish Air Division of the RN Volunteer Reserve, moving shortly afterwards to Abbotsinch. It shared the aircraft of No.1830 Squadron, becoming No.1843 Squadron in March 1953. Avengers arrived in November 1955, but No.1843 disbanded on 10 March 1957 under the defence cuts of that year.

Aircraft operated

References

Citations

Bibliography

External links
 

1800 series Fleet Air Arm squadrons
Military units and formations established in 1944
Military units and formations of the Royal Navy in World War II